The Upper Naryn hydropower cascade is a hydropower project in Naryn Region, Kyrgyzstan. When completed, it will consist of 4 hydropower plants on the river Naryn: Ak-Bulung, Naryn-1, Naryn-2 and Naryn-3, with a total installed capacity of 238 MW.

Construction was started in June 2013 by the company "Verkhne-Narynskiye GES", a joint venture of the Russian company RusHydro and the Kyrgyz state-owned company "Elektricheskiye stantsii". However, it was interrupted in 2015 due to financial difficulties at RusHydro, and in December 2015 the Kyrgyz government decided to terminate the agreement with the Russian Federation.

References

Hydroelectric power stations in Kyrgyzstan
Proposed hydroelectric power stations
Proposed renewable energy power stations in Kyrgyzstan